Advance to the Fall is the second studio album by Japanese power metal band Galneryus. It was released on March 23, 2005.

Track listing

Credits
Syu – Lead/rhythm guitars/backing vocals
Yama-B – Vocals
Tsui – Bass/backing vocals
Yuhki – Keyboards/backing vocals
Junichi Satoh – Drums

Chart performance
The album reached number 86 on the Oricon album charts.

References

External links
 Official Galneryus website 

Galneryus albums
2005 albums